Francis Wall Oliver FRS (10 May 1864 – 14 September 1951) was an English botanist.

He was educated at Bootham School, York.

He was Quain Professor of Botany at University College London 1890–1925 where he supervised the PhD of Margaret Jane Benson, and then Professor of Botany at the University of Cairo 1929–1935.  He was elected a Fellow of the Royal Society in 1905. He was awarded the Linnean Medal in 1925.

He edited a book titled Makers of British Botany which contained biographies of British botanists Robert Morison, John Ray, Nehemiah Grew, Stephen Hales, John Hill, Robert Brown, William Hooker, John Stevens Henslow, John Lindley, William Griffith, Arthur Henfrey, William Henry Harvey, Miles Joseph Berkeley, Joseph Henry Gilbert, William Crawford Williamson, Harry Marshall Ward and Joseph Dalton Hooker.

References

External links

People educated at Bootham School
Fellows of the Royal Society
English botanists
Academics of University College London
1864 births
1951 deaths
Academic staff of Cairo University